In music, the cross motif  is a motif.

A motif (Crux fidelis) was used by Franz Liszt to represent the Christian cross ('tonisches Symbol des Kreuzes' or tonic symbol of the cross) and taken from Gregorian melodies.

See also
Bach motif
Cruciform#Cruciform melody

Sources

Motifs (music)
Franz Liszt